Mivaleh Sofla (also Romanized as Mīvaleh Soflá; also known as Mīvaleh and Mīsūleh) is a village in Doab Rural District, in the Central District of Selseleh County, Lorestan Province, Iran. At the 2006 census, its population was 31, in 9 families.

References 

Towns and villages in Selseleh County